The 2012 Sweden Invitational was an association football tournament organized in Sweden. It was held 16–20 June 2012 and featured 3 teams: Japan, Sweden and the United States.

Results

References

Sweden Invitational
Sweden Invitational
Sweden Invitational
Sweden Invitational